Gosling Emacs (often shortened to "Gosmacs" or "gmacs") is a discontinued Emacs implementation written in 1981 by James Gosling in C.

Gosling initially allowed Gosling Emacs to be redistributed with no formal restrictions, as required by the "Emacs commune" since the 1970s, but later sold it to UniPress. The disputes with UniPress inspired the creation of the first formal license for Emacs, which later became the GPL, as Congress had introduced copyright for software in 1980.

Features

Gosling Emacs was especially noteworthy because of the effective redisplay code, which used a dynamic programming technique to solve the classical string-to-string correction problem. The algorithm was quite sophisticated; that section of the source was headed by a skull-and-crossbones in ASCII art, warning any would-be improver that even if they thought they understood how the display code worked, they probably did not.

Distribution

Since Gosling had permitted its unrestricted redistribution, Richard Stallman used some Gosling Emacs code in the initial version of GNU Emacs. Among other things, he rewrote part of the Gosling code headed by the skull-and-crossbones comment and made it "...shorter, faster, clearer and more extensible."

In 1983 UniPress began selling Gosling Emacs on Unix for $395 and on VMS for $2,500, marketing it as "EMACS–multi-window text editor (Gosling version)".

Controversially, Unipress asked Stallman to stop distributing his version of Emacs for Unix.
UniPress never took legal action against Stallman or his nascent Free Software Foundation, believing "hobbyists and academics could never produce an Emacs that could compete" with their product. All Gosling Emacs code was removed from GNU Emacs by version 16.56 (July 1985), with the possible exception of a few particularly involved sections of the display code. The latest versions of GNU Emacs (since August 2004) do not feature the skull-and-crossbones warning.

Extension language
Its extension language, Mocklisp, has a syntax that appears similar to Lisp, but Mocklisp does not have lists or any other structured datatypes. The Mocklisp interpreter, built by Gosling and a collaborator, was replaced by a full Lisp interpreter in GNU Emacs.

References 

 Christopher Kelty, "EMACS, grep, and UNIX: authorship, invention and translation in software", https://web.archive.org/web/20110728022656/http://www.burlingtontelecom.net/~ashawley/gnu/emacs/ConText-Kelty.pdf

Emacs
Unix text editors
1981 software